Le Vert is a commune in the Deux-Sèvres department in western France. It is around 25 km south of Niort.

There are no shops in the village. The nearest pâtisserie is in Chizé.

Geography
The commune is traversed by the river Boutonne.
To the south of the village is the border between Deux-Sèvres and Charente-Maritime.

See also
Communes of the Deux-Sèvres department

References

Communes of Deux-Sèvres